The 1998 FIA GT Dijon 500 km was the fourth round the 1998 FIA GT Championship season.  It took place at Dijon-Prenois, France, on July 12, 1998.

Official results
Class winners are in bold.  Cars failing to complete 70% of winner's distance are marked as Not Classified (NC).

Statistics
 Pole position – #1 AMG Mercedes – 1:08.762
 Fastest lap – #1 AMG Mercedes – 1:10.861
 Average speed – 180.989 km/h

References

 
 
 

D
Dijon 500